Johnny Wahlqvist ( – 30 January 2017) was a Swedish powerlifter. One of Sweden's most successful champions, specifically in bench press, he competed and won in the national, European, and world championships.

He appeared in several television programs, namely Talang Sverige and Boston Tea Party.

Peak measurements
Height: 69 inches
Weight: 400 pounds in 2012
Chest: 72½ inches at 400 pounds bodyweight.
Biceps (Flexed): 26 inch at 400 pounds bodyweight.
Shoulder circumference: 84 inches at 400 pounds bodyweight.

Sources

External links
 Johnny Wahlqvist website

1970s births
2017 deaths
Swedish powerlifters
Year of birth missing